Synhimantus is a genus of nematodes belonging to the family Acuariidae.

Species:

Synhimantus australiensis 
Synhimantus bubulcusi 
Synhimantus canadensis 
Synhimantus coucalus 
Synhimantus elliptica 
Synhimantus falco 
Synhimantus falconis 
Synhimantus groffi 
Synhimantus hamatus 
Synhimantus hanumanthai 
Synhimantus hyderabadensis 
Synhimantus invaginata 
Synhimantus kanpurensis 
Synhimantus laticeps 
Synhimantus lichenostomi 
Synhimantus longigutturatus 
Synhimantus magnipapillatus 
Synhimantus nipponensis 
Synhimantus oti 
Synhimantus pelecani 
Synhimantus petrowi 
Synhimantus podargi 
Synhimantus rectus 
Synhimantus robertdollfusi 
Synhimantus sirry 
Synhimantus subrectus 
Synhimantus zosteropsi

References

Nematodes